Still Life with Beer Mug and Fruit is an oil painting created in September 1881.

The painting was originally attributed to Vincent van Gogh, but subsequently was found to be the work of an unknown artist.

1881 paintings